Krystian Miś (born 12 April 1996) is a Polish professional footballer who plays as a left-back for II liga club Pogoń Siedlce.

Career

Piast Żmigród
On 23 August 2019 it was confirmed, that Miś had joined Polish club MKS Piast Żmigród.

Pogoń Siedlce
On 5 August 2020, he signed a two-year contract with Pogoń Siedlce. After being a free agent for two months, on 1 September 2022 he rejoined Pogoń on a one-year deal.

References

External links

1996 births
People from Syców
Living people
Polish footballers
Association football defenders
Korona Kielce players
Wisła Płock players
MKP Pogoń Siedlce players
Ekstraklasa players
II liga players
III liga players